Intharat Apinyakool (born 30 May 1982) is a Thai retired professional footballer who played as a goalkeeper.

International career

He played for Thailand at the 1999 FIFA U-17 World Championship in New Zealand and the 2005 FIFA Beach Soccer World Cup in Brazil.

Honours

Club
Bangkok Christian College
 Thai Division 1 League (1): 2001–02

References

External links
 Profile at Goal
https://th.soccerway.com/players/intharat-apinyakun/288455/

1982 births
Living people
Intharat Apinyakool
Intharat Apinyakool
Association football goalkeepers
Intharat Apinyakool
Intharat Apinyakool
Intharat Apinyakool
Intharat Apinyakool
Intharat Apinyakool
Intharat Apinyakool
Intharat Apinyakool
Intharat Apinyakool
Intharat Apinyakool
Intharat Apinyakool